The Sammamish River Trail is a  bike path and recreational rail trail in King County, Washington that runs along the Sammamish River from Blyth Park in Bothell to Marymoor Park in Redmond as part of the “Locks to Lakes Corridor.” It connects to the Burke-Gilman Trail at its northwestern end, and to the Redmond Central Connector at its southeastern end.

Route
The trail is paved for bicycle, inline-skate and pedestrian use and is paralleled for most of its length by an unpaved equestrian trail.  It passes near the Chateau Ste. Michelle, Columbia and Silver Lake wineries in Woodinville, as well as the former site of the Redhook Ale brewery, which was leased by DeLille Cellars, Sparkman Cellars and Teatro ZinZanni.

The trail has a very slight grade for its entire length.

Connecting trails

Other trails connecting with the Sammamish River Trail include the East Lake Sammamish Trail, Tolt Pipeline Trail and Puget Power trail.

References

External links
 King County Trails
 King County Bike Map

Parks in King County, Washington
Transportation in King County, Washington
Parks in Redmond, Washington
Parks in Bothell, Washington
Woodinville, Washington